Pseudohoeflea suaedae is a bacterium from the genus Pseudohoeflea which has been isolated from the root of the plant Suaeda maritima from the tidal flat of Namhae Island on Korea.

References

External links
Type strain of Hoeflea suaedae at BacDive -  the Bacterial Diversity Metadatabase

Phyllobacteriaceae
Bacteria described in 2013